Megahippus (Greek: "great" (mega), "horse" (hippos)) is an extinct equid genus belonging to the subfamily Anchitheriinae. As with other members of this subfamily, Megahippus is more primitive than the living horses. Fossil remains of Megahippus have been found across the U.S., from Montana to Florida.

References

External links
 Mikko's phylogeny archive
 Paleobiology Database

Miocene horses
Prehistoric placental genera
Miocene odd-toed ungulates
Miocene mammals of North America
Fossil taxa described in 1938